Carlos Eduardo "Preto" Casagrande (born 7 May 1975 in Cascavel) is a Brazilian former professional footballer who played at both club and international levels as a defensive midfielder.

Honours

Player
Vitória
 Campeonato Baiano: 1997, 1999
 Copa do Nordeste: 1997, 1999

 Bahia
 Campeonato Baiano: 2001
 Copa do Nordeste: 2001, 2002

 Santos
 Campeonato Brasileiro Série A: 2004

 Fluminense
 Campeonato Carioca: 2005

References 

People from Cascavel
1975 births
Living people
Brazilian football managers
Brazilian footballers
Campeonato Brasileiro Série A players
Campeonato Brasileiro Série A managers
Brazilian expatriate footballers
Brazil international footballers
Association football midfielders
CR Vasco da Gama players
Olaria Atlético Clube players
Esporte Clube Vitória players
Vitória S.C. players
Esporte Clube Bahia players
Club Athletico Paranaense players
Santos FC players
Fluminense FC players
Fortaleza Esporte Clube players
Volta Redonda FC players
Esporte Clube Bahia managers
Sportspeople from Paraná (state)